Future Lasts Forever is a 2011 Turkish drama film, written and directed by Özcan Alper, starring Gaye Gürsel as an Istanbul music student who travels to south-east Turkey to record traditional music and confront her own past.

Release and reception

Festival screenings 
World Premiere: 36th Toronto International Film Festival (September 8–18, 2011)
18th International Adana Golden Boll Film Festival (September 17–25, 2011)

Awards 
18th International Adana Golden Boll Film Festival (September 17–25, 2011)
 Best Actor: Durukan Ordu (won)
 Best Music: Mustafa Biber  (won)
 Best Cinematography: Feza Çaldıran (won)
 Yılmaz Güney Award (won) 
 Turkish Film Critics Association (SİYAD) Best Film Award (won)

See also
 Turkish films of 2011
 2011 in film

References

External links 
 

2011 drama films
Films set in Turkey
Films set in Istanbul
2011 films
Turkish drama films